Skelton Junction is a complex of railway junctions to the south of Manchester in Timperley, near Altrincham. Both the Cheshire Lines Committee's Liverpool to Manchester line, via the Glazebrook East Junction to Skelton Junction Line and the LNWR's Warrington and Altrincham Junction Railway fed into the junction from Liverpool in the west. The Manchester, South Junction and Altrincham Railway provided a connection from the Altrincham direction and a short spur from Timperley towards Stockport, while the CLC's Stockport, Timperley and Altrincham Junction Railway continued east to Stockport.

The lines today

Active
The only line currently in use is the line from Altrincham towards Stockport; this is used by the Chester to Manchester Piccadilly via Altrincham and Northwich service.  Additionally various freight workings use the line including heavy block trains carrying limestone from quarries at Tunstead (near Buxton) to alkali works at Northwich.

Closed
The line via Broadheath and Lymm to Warrington closed on 7 July 1985 and has now been lifted. The line via West Timperley and Partington is still intact as far as Partington, but has been disused since October 1993, when all regular freight traffic to the chemical works ceased. The Great Central Railway connection north from the CLC to the MSJ&A Rly towards Timperley Station closed before the Second World War. There used to be a small marshalling yard including a turntable in the fork between the Altrincham and Partington lines. The yard was traversed by a long concrete foot bridge known locally as The Black Bridge. This has now been replaced by a shorter green steel bridge but it is still known as The Black Bridge.

References

Rail transport in Cheshire
Rail junctions in England